The Fortunato Anselmo House (also known as the Ronald L. Beers House) is a historic house built in Late Victorian style located at 164 South 900 East in Salt Lake City, Utah, United States.

Description and history 
The house was built in 1903 by a carpenter and contractor named Silas B. Wood at approximately $4,000 in cost. In 1920, it became home for Fortunato and Anna Anselmo, who owned it until 1950. It became significant as the residence of the country of Italy's "vice consul for Utah and Wyoming". Fortunate Anselmo, originally of Grimaldi, Italy, had become a spokesperson of Italian community as a newspaper owner, but sold the newspaper in 1915 upon being appointed vice consul. He continued to serve as an agent of the Bank of Naples, sending money orders from Italian-Americans of Salt Lake City back to their home country.

It was listed on the National Register of Historic Places on May 21, 1979, for having a state-wide significance.

See also

 National Register of Historic Places listings in Salt Lake City

References

Houses on the National Register of Historic Places in Utah
Italian-American culture in Utah
Victorian architecture in Utah
Houses completed in 1903
Houses in Salt Lake County, Utah
National Register of Historic Places in Salt Lake City